Julius E. F. Gipkens (16 February 1883 – 1968) was a German painter, illustrator and graphic designer.

Early life and career

Julius Gipkens was born in Hannover, Germany. Gipkens was self-taught and found inspiration in Lucian Bernhard's work, eventually contributing greatly to the Sachplakat (Plakatstil) style himself. Gipkens moved to Berlin and started working. Alongside Lucian Bernhard, Hans Rudi Erdt and Julius Klinger he was employed on an exclusive contract with Hollerbaum & Schmidt. He created posters for Germany during World War I. After the war, he created illustrations for advertising and design firms, and newspapers. He immigrated to the United States in 1933.

Notable works

Typefaces
Admiral (1906)
Admiral Halbfett (1906)
Femina (1913)
Majestic (1914)

Death and legacy
He died in New York City. His work is held in the collections of the Library of Congress and Victoria & Albert Museum.

See also
 List of German painters

References

1883 births
1968 deaths
19th-century German painters
19th-century German male artists
German male painters
20th-century German painters
20th-century German male artists
German illustrators
German graphic designers
Artists from Berlin
Artists from New York (state)
German poster artists